The South African Railways Class 4E of 1952 was an electric locomotive.

Between 1952 and 1954, the South African Railways placed forty Class 4E electric locomotives with a 1Co+Co1 wheel arrangement in temporary service on the Natal mainline and from 1954 on the mainline from Cape Town across the Hex River rail pass to Touws River in the Karoo.

Manufacturer

The 3 kV DC Class 4E electric locomotive was designed for the South African Railways (SAR) by the General Electric Company (GEC) and was built by the North British Locomotive Company (NBL) in 1952 and 1953. They were delivered between 1952 and 1954 and were numbered in the range from E219 to E258. The Class 4E was amongst the most powerful electric locomotives in the world at that time.

Orientation
These dual cab locomotives had two large grilles on one side and a corridor linking the cabs on the opposite side. When observing the locomotive from the side with the grilles, the number 1 end would be to the right. As on the earlier Class 3E, the unit had side doors on both sides behind each cab. It had roof access ladders on the smooth left side only, one aft of each side door. Like the Classes 1E, 2E and 3E, the Class 4E had bogie-mounted pilots and draft gear and an articulated inter-bogie linkage, therefore no train forces were transmitted to the locomotive body.

As delivered, the Class 4E units did not have the "eyebrow" sunshades above the front windscreens. These were later fitted in Cape Town to prevent pantograph grease from befouling the windscreens.

The Class 4E had a 1Co+Co1 wheel arrangement, with an additional bissel truck at the outer end of each of the two three-axle powered bogies. The Classes 32-000 and 32-200 diesel-electric locomotive types also used this wheel arrangement, but the Class 4E was unique amongst South African electric locomotives in this respect.

Service
The Class 4E was specifically acquired for use on the mainline from Cape Town across the Hex River rail pass to Touws River, from where Class 23 and later Class 25 and Class 25NC steam locomotives would take over across the stretch of unelectrified mainline to De Aar and from there to either Kimberley or Bloemfontein.

Since the completion of Eskom's high-tension power feeds in the Cape was late, the first locomotives to be delivered in 1952 were placed in service on the Natal mainline while awaiting electrification from Wellington via Worcester to Touws River. They were to be transferred to the Cape as soon as the wires were energised, but they eventually had to be withdrawn from Natal earlier because the severe curvature of the Natal mainline caused their frames to crack.

Class leader no. E219 was the first unit to be relocated to Cape Town in March 1953, where it initially ran on the 1.5 kV DC power which was still being used for Cape Town's suburban trains until the upgrading of the Cape Town lines to 3 kV DC was completed in November 1954. The 3 kV DC electrification from Worcester had reached Touws river in April 1954. Until then, the locomotive's load capacity and mobility were restricted. The problem was hunting which became increasingly severe at higher speed and the units were therefore employed mainly on goods traffic until 1956, by which time their bogie faults had been ironed out.

The Class 4E was rated at double the load of a Class 15F without banker over the Hex River rail pass, 770 tons against 360 tons for the same train length. With assistance from a banker between De Doorns and Matroosberg, a Class 15F and Class 14CRM combination could almost match the Class 4E, but between Cape Town and De Doorns an unaided Class 4E could haul half as much again as a Class 15F, 1264 tons as against 820 tons.

Two Class 4E units briefly served on the Western Transvaal System while being relocated from Natal via Transvaal to the Cape. That system was granted permission to use no. E247 and one other for between four and six weeks, working from the Electric Running Shed at Braamfontein, before the locomotives were forwarded to Cape Town.

From 1954 onwards, the Class 4E took over working of the Blue Train with increasing regularity, long before the last Class 15Fs were drafted away to the Cape Midland System in September 1957.

Hex River tunnels scheme
The Class 4E purchase was part of a scheme to eliminate the 1 in 40 (2.5%) gradients and severe curvature of the Hex River rail pass, which would also entail the construction of a series of four tunnels through the Hex River Mountains. The tunnel system would have enabled a single Class 4E locomotive to haul 1,000 ton trains up the resulting 1 in 66 (1½%) gradients.

The Hex River tunnels scheme (Hexton) was initially started in 1945, but was deferred indefinitely in 1950 as a result of financial constraints. The tunnel scheme was briefly resuscitated in 1965 but was deferred once again in 1966. Work was eventually resumed in 1974 and included the remodelling of the lower section of the deviation between De Doorns and Osplaas as well as the construction of the short twin tunnels. This was completed in 1976, at which point financial constraints resulted in yet another postponement. Authority to proceed was only given once again in late 1979.

When the project was resumed, the eastern portal of the longest tunnel was relocated a short distance to the southeast of the original site, while the location of the western portal remained as originally planned. The tunnel system was opened on 27 November 1989, by which time the Class 4Es were already withdrawn from service after having spent their entire careers double-heading trains across the Hex River rail pass.

Liveries
The Class 4E was delivered in an all-over green livery with red cowcatchers. The colour and the almost  length of the locomotive quickly earned it the nickname  (Green Mamba).

Soon after they entered service, Hex River Valley farmers complained that the bottle green livery made the locomotives difficult to see when they were approaching through the vineyards. In 1954, yellow lines were added all around the locomotive to improve its visibility, with various line patterns being used before eventually settling on the V shaped whiskers on the ends which extended onto the sides, and multiple lines around the number plates on the sides. The attractive whiskers livery was adopted for all the electric locomotive classes of the SAR.

Beginning in 1960, a Gulf Red and yellow whiskers livery gradually replaced the green and yellow.

Preservation
As of 2015, no. E258 has been staged at Bloemfontein Locomotive Depot where a Locomotive Museum is being created to restore it and some other historically significant units. Class leader no. E219 survives at Krugersdorp's Millsite Locomotive Depot.

Works numbers
The NBL works numbers of the Class 4E are listed in the table.

Illustration

References

Cape gauge railway locomotives
2770
GEC locomotives
NBL locomotives
Railway locomotives introduced in 1952
1-C+C-1 locomotives
(1′Co)+(Co1′) locomotives
1Co+Co1 locomotives